The Singapore Cricket Club (SCC) is one of the premier sports and social clubs in Singapore. 
Its clubhouse is located on Connaught Drive on the south end of the Padang in Singapore's central business district.

History 
The SCC was established in 1852. Over the years, the club has had three clubhouse buildings on the Padang. The first was erected in the 1860s and the second in 1877. The third, which forms the core of the present-day clubhouse, was built in 1884.

As the second oldest club in Singapore, the SCC today has over 3,000 members. Cricket, rugby, football and field hockey are played on the Padang, and the club also has facilities for squash, tennis, lawn bowls, billiards and snooker.

The club has played host to many international cricket events over the years. It also hosts the annual Singapore Cricket Club International Rugby Sevens tournament and an annual Soccer Sevens competition.

They also have a football team participating in the National Football League.

References

External links

Official website of the Singapore Cricket Club
SCC Rugby Sevens website

Football clubs in Singapore
Clubs and societies in Singapore
Cricket in Singapore
Downtown Core (Singapore)
Multi-sport clubs in Singapore
Protected areas of Singapore
Cricket clubs established in 1852
Sports organisations of Singapore
1852 establishments in the British Empire
Club cricket